"Can't Give You More" is a single released by the British Rock band Status Quo in 1991. The original version was included on the album Rockin' All Over The World. This single was a re-recorded version which was to be used as an advertising campaign for Perrier Water. The words 'Eau Eau Eau' were also included in the title on some of the 7 inch vinyl copies. However, due to various problems encountered by the Perrier company at the time the campaign was cancelled. This re-recorded version was included on the Rock 'til You Drop album.

Track listing
 7 inch/cassette
 "Can't Give You More" (Rossi/Young) (3.55)
 "Dead in the Water" (Rossi/Bown) (3.45)

 12 inch/CD
 "Can't Give You More" (Rossi/Young) (3.55)
 "Dead in the Water" (Rossi/Bown) (3.45)
 "Mysteries from the Ball" (Rossi/Parfitt) (3.42)

Charts

References

Status Quo (band) songs
1991 singles
Songs written by Bob Young (musician)
Songs written by Francis Rossi
1991 songs
Vertigo Records singles